Falls of Orrin is a waterfall on the River Orrin, in the Highlands of Scotland.

See also
Waterfalls of Scotland

References

Waterfalls of Highland (council area)